Burdwan Lok Sabha constituency was one of the 543 parliamentary constituencies in India. The constituency centred on Bardhaman in West Bengal, which was abolished following the delimitation of the parliamentary constituencies in 2008.

Overview
As per order of the Delimitation Commission in 2006 in respect of the delimitation of constituencies in the West Bengal, this parliamentary constituency ceased to exist and assembly segments were part of either of the two new constituencies: Bardhaman Purba Lok Sabha constituency or Bardhaman-Durgapur Lok Sabha constituency. Only Khandaghosh assembly segment will be part of Bishnupur Lok Sabha constituency.

Vidhan Sabha segments
Prior to delimitation, Burdwan Lok Sabha constituency was composed of the following assembly segments in 2004:
 Bhatar (assembly constituency no. 268)
 Bardhaman North (assembly constituency no. 270)
 Bardhaman South (assembly constituency no. 271)
 Khandaghosh (SC) (assembly constituency no. 272)
 Raina (assembly constituency no. 273)
 Jamalpur (SC) (assembly constituency no. 274)
 Memari (assembly constituency no. 275)

Members of Lok Sabha

 For Members of Parliament from this area in subsequent years see Bardhaman Purba Lok Sabha constituency and Bardhaman-Durgapur Lok Sabha constituency.

Results of elections

General election 2004

General elections 1977-2004
Most of the contests were multi-cornered. However, only winners and runners-up are generally mentioned below:

See also
Bardhaman, formerly known as Burdwan
List of Constituencies of the Lok Sabha

References

Former Lok Sabha constituencies of West Bengal
Politics of Purba Bardhaman district
Former constituencies of the Lok Sabha
2008 disestablishments in India
Constituencies disestablished in 2008